Florida's 119th House District elects one member of the Florida House of Representatives. The district is represented by Juan Fernandez-Barquin. The district covers part of Miami-Dade County.

Members

References 

119
Miami-Dade County, Florida